Eleni Foureira (born Entela Fureraj; 7 March 1987) is a naturalised Greek, Albanian singer and dancer. She began her music career in 2007 as a member of the Greek girl group Mystique, pursuing a solo career after the group disbanded in 2009. She released five studio albums since.

Foureira signed a solo contract with Universal Music Greece and released her self-titled debut album in 2010. She later signed with Minos EMI, and went on to release her second and third studio albums Ti Poniro Mou Zitas and Anemos Agapis in 2012 and 2014, respectively. Both albums were well-received in Greece and Cyprus. Foureira left Minos EMI in 2015, and signed with Panik Records. Her fourth studio album Vasilissa was released in December 2017. 

After being rejected several times in her efforts to represent Greece, Foureira represented Cyprus in the Eurovision Song Contest 2018 with the song "Fuego". She was one of three ethnically Albanian competitors. On 8 May 2018, she qualified from the first semi-final to the grand final, where she finished second with 436 points, thereby achieving Cyprus' best Eurovision result to date.

In 2019, Foureira released the EP Gypsy Woman, followed in 2020 by the release of singles "Yayo", "Temperatura" and "Light It Up". In 2021, she hosted the Greek talent show House of Fame - La Academia at Skai TV. Afterwards, she collaborated with Greek rapper MadClip on the song "Mporei", which became one of the biggest hits of the year in Greece. The song "Aeraki (To Thiliko)" followed with similar success. On June 3rd 2022, Eleni released her fifth studio album called “Poli_Ploki”.

Early life
Foureira was born as Entela Fureraj on 7 March 1987 in Fier, Albania. Her mother is a seamstress, while her father works in construction. She has three siblings: Ioanna, Margarita, and Giorgos. Foureira grew up in the Eastern Orthodox faith, and has a grandfather who was from Greece. When she was four years old, the family moved to the city of Vlorë, and later moved to Greece due to the Albanian Civil War in 1997. While living in Albania, the family had electricity for only two hours a day, and left for Greece after their home was hit with bullets. Upon arriving in Greece, Foureira and her family settled in Athens.

Foureira began pursuing music at a young age, learning how to play guitar and later working in a theatre for three years.

Career

2007–2009: Early career and Mystique
Foureira began her music career as a member of the girl group Mystique. She was discovered by Andreas Giatrakos, and the group also consisted of Alkmini Chatzigianni and Maria Makri. They released their debut single "Se alli selida" in 2007, and later achieved success with the single "Min kaneis pos de thymasai" featuring Greek hip hop group NEVMA the following year. They broke up in 2009.

2010–2018: Pursuit of a solo career

After Mystique broke up, Foureira signed a solo contract with Universal Music Greece, the same label as Mystique. She appeared on the charity program Just the Two of Us, hosted by Mega Channel. She tied for first place along with singer Panagiotis Petrakis. Foureira released her self-titled debut studio album in December 2010. Afterwards, she signed with Minos EMI. Her second album Ti Poniro Mou Zitas was released in 2012, while her third Anemos agapis was released in 2014. From 2015 to 2016, she starred as Sofia in the musical Barbarella: the 80's Musical in Athens, alongside other Greek pop stars such as Ivi Adamou and Katy Garbi. Following the release of Anemos agapis, she left Minos EMI and signed with Panik Records. She was a judge on season three of the Greek version of So You Think You Can Dance. Her fourth studio album Vasilissa was released in 2017.

Eurovision Song Contest 2018

Foureira has made several attempts to represent Greece in the Eurovision Song Contest. In 2010, she took part in the Greek national final for the Eurovision Song Contest 2010 with Manos Pyrovolakis, performing the song "Kivotos tou Noe". They placed second behind Giorgos Alkaios. In 2013, she performed "Wild Dances" with Ruslana at Eurosong 2013 – a MAD show. She later considered taking part in Eurosong 2015 - NERIT & MAD show, but ultimately did not. She once again attempted to represent Greece in the Eurovision Song Contest 2016 with the song "Come Tiki Tam", but was rejected by Hellenic Broadcasting Corporation (ERT). In 2017, she was rejected by the broadcaster for the Eurovision Song Contest 2017 once again.

In February 2018, it was confirmed that Foureira would represent Cyprus in the Eurovision Song Contest 2018 with the song "Fuego". The song was composed by Greek-Swedish songwriter Alex Papaconstantinou. Foureira was seen as one of three ethnic Albanians competing that year, each of them representing different countries. Foureira posed with Albanian contestant Eugent Bushpepa, making the crossed hands gesture denoting the double eagle of the Flag of Albania. In response, nationalist Greeks spoke out against Foureira, saying she should be removed from the contest, but Cyprus continued to support her. On 8 May 2018, she qualified from the first semi-final to the grand final. In the final held on 12 May 2018, she finished as the runner-up to winner Netta from Israel, having received the fifth most votes from the international juries and the second most votes from the public televoting process; this marked Cyprus' best Eurovision placement in history.

2018–present: Post-Eurovision success
Shortly after Eurovision 2018, Eleni signed a record deal with Sony Music. By doing so, she become only the second Greek artist to sign an international deal with a major record label after Helena Paparizou (who won the Eurovision Song Contest 2005). In late June, she released her Greek single "Caramela", which topped the Digital Single Chart. In mid-October, she released the non-album single "Tómame", which was also number one hit. Towards the end of the year, it was announced that "Fuego" has been certified platinum in Spain, and gold in Norway and Sweden, becoming Eleni's first song to achieve this.

On 17 May 2019, Eleni released her first international project, an extended play titled Gypsy Woman (EP), which includes the song "El Ritmo Psicodelico" as the lead single. To further promote her studio project, she embarked on a European tour in various cities in Greece, Spain, and the United Kingdom. Around the same time, during the Host Broadcaster press conference of the Eurovision Song Contest 2019, Foureira was announced as one of the four artists from previous contests that will perform as an interval act in the final, where she performed the 2007 runner-up Verka Serduchka's song "Dancing Lasha Tumbai". Throughout the rest of the year, she mostly took part in collaborations with artists such as Kaan and Snoop Dogg, and Claydee. In March 2020, she released the electropop and R&B single Yayo. In June, she released a Greek single "Temperatura", which was later accompanied with a Spanish version.

In December 2019, she performed as a surprise guest at Festivali i Këngës 58, the Albanian national selection contest for Eurovision, held in Tirana, Albania. After performing a medley of her own songs and international hits, she sang a few Albanian folk songs alongside TV presenter Alketa Vejsiu, accompanied with a monologue in the Albanian language on her Albanian roots, since she moved from Albania during her childhood.

Towards the end of 2020, Eleni Foureira released two dance-pop, electropop, nu-disco, and synth-pop records "Light It Up" (in October) and "Dokimase Me" (in December), both of which contain 1980s and retrofuturism tropes. Around the same time, during a live stream on her official Instagram account, the singer revealed that her forthcoming second extended play, entitled Light It Up, is set for release in early 2021. At May 2021 she released a song with Greek rapper MadClip, titled "Mporei", which was awarded as the best duet at Super Music Awards

In May 2022, she collaborated on "Mono Esy Kai Ego" with Greek singer Konstantinos Argiros. On 3 June 2022, Foureira released her fifth studio album, Poli Ploki, preceded by the singles "Mporei" and "Aeraki (To Thiliko)".

Personal life

Relationships
Since 2017, she has been in a relationship with Alberto Botía, a Spanish footballer who was playing in Greece for the team Olympiacos F.C. at the time. On 13 November 2022, Foureira announced her pregnancy via her Instagram account. She gave birth to a baby boy on 7 February 2023.

Origin controversy
Since the beginning of her career, the Greek media have speculated on Foureira's ancestral origins. As a member of Mystique, she claimed to be Brazilian. She later claimed that her father was from Athens and her mother from Ioannina, although she had some Mexican ancestry as well. In 2018, Foureira confirmed that she became a Greek citizen through descent, and also declared that her grandfather was Greek.

In 2013, it was reported by the Greek media that Foureira was born in Albania and that her birth name was Entela Fureraj. Foureira did not comment on the reports until 2014, when she confirmed them. She claimed that she did not reveal her origin in order to be accepted in the music industry in Greece. She continued claiming she never understood the issue, since she always felt Greek and she has received only Greek education. Andreas Giatrakos, who discovered Foureira and recruited her to join Mystique, later stated that he wanted Foureira to be proud of her origin and would not have rejected her if he knew she was born in Albania.

During the Eurovision Song Contest 2018, Foureira made the Albanian patriotic eagle gesture in a photo with Albanian singer Eugent Bushpepa. The image went viral in Albania and Greece, being well-received in the former but causing controversy in the latter.

Discography

Eleni Foureira (2010)
Ti Poniro Mou Zitas (2012)
Anemos Agapis (2014)
Vasilissa (2017)
Gypsy Woman (EP) (2019)
Poli_Ploki (2022)

Filmography

Television

Theater

Film

Tours and residencies

Concert tours

Headlining tour
 Summer Tour (2017)
 European Summer Tour (2018)
 Fuego Tour (2018–2019)
 Gypsy Woman Tour (2019)
 Poli_Ploki Tour (2022)
 The Reborn Summer Tour (2023) (UPCOMING)
Promotional tour
 Summer Tour (with Kostas Martakis) (2010)
 Summer Concerts (2015)
 Summer Concerts (2020)
 European Concerts (2021)

Co-headling tour
 Summer Tour (with Antonis Remos and Stelios Rokkos) (2013)
 The Ace Of Hearts 2014 (with Sakis Rouvas, Onirama, Boys & Noise and Xenia Ghali) (2014)
 Eleftheros Tour (with Konstantinos Argyros) (2022)
Opening act
 Maluma World Tour (guest star at Maluma's concert) (2022)

Concert residencies

Co-headlining residency – primary act
 Fantasia (with Pantelis Pantelidis and Melisses) (2015)
 Fantasia (with Konstantinos Argyros and Fani Drakopoulou) (2016)
 Fantasia (with Konstantinos Argyros and Fani Drakopoulou) (2016–2017)
 Vogue Club (with Konstantinos Argyros and Fani Drakopoulou) (2017)
 Athinon Arena (with Antonis Remos) (2017–2018)
 Teatro Athens (with Konstantinos Argyros) (2021–2022)

Co-headlining residency – secondary act
 Thalassa: People’s Stage (with Giorgos Mazonakis) (2012)
 Kentro Athinon (with Nikos Vertis) (2014–2015)
 Teatro Music Hall (with Paola and Konstantinos Argyros) (2015–2016)

Co-headlining residency – tertiary act
 Anodos Live Stage (with Natassa Theodoridou, Kostas Martakis and Ilias Vretos) (2010–2011)
 Pyli Axiou: Live Clubbing (with Sakis Rouvas and Tamta) (2011)
 Athinon Arena (with Sakis Rouvas and Onirama) (2011–2012)
 Athinon Arena (with Antonis Remos and Stelios Rokkos) (2012–2013)
 Fever (with Nikos Oikonomopoulos and Vasilis Karras) (2013–2014)

Awards and nominations

References

External links

Official website

1987 births
Albanian emigrants to Greece
Greek people of Albanian descent
Eastern Orthodox Christians from Albania
Eastern Orthodox Christians from Greece
Eurovision Song Contest entrants for Cyprus
Eurovision Song Contest entrants of 2018
Greek laïko singers
Greek dance musicians
Greek female dancers
21st-century Albanian women singers
21st-century Greek women singers
Albanian pop singers
Greek pop singers
Greek stage actresses
Living people
MAD Video Music Awards winners
Minos EMI artists
Naturalized citizens of Greece
Panik Records artists
People from Fier
Singers from Athens
Universal Music Greece artists